The Helen Rollason Cancer Charity, located in the United Kingdom, provides support to those affected by cancer. It was founded in 1999 and named after Helen Rollason MBE, who died of cancer at age 43.

Cancer support 

Founded in 1999, the charity is the legacy of BBC broadcaster Helen Rollason, whose vision was: “Good quality of life while coping with cancer is the most important gift a sick person can receive. It should be available to everyone.” HRCC has four cancer support centres based in Chelmsford, Southend, Edmonton and Bishop's Stortford, as well as a cancer support hub at Braintree Community Hospital and GenesisCare Hospital in Springfield. The centres offer a range of complementary therapies to patients in an environment of peace and tranquillity, including counselling, reflexology, aromatherapy, manual lymphatic drainage and support groups.

Shops 
The charity has a network of nine shops run by volunteers in the Herts, Essex and London areas. They provide funding for the cancer support centres. The charity's shops are located in Burnham-on-Crouch, Chingford, Danbury, Ongar, Sawbridgeworth, South Woodford, Wickford and Witham.

References

External links

Health charities in the United Kingdom
Cancer organisations based in the United Kingdom
Organizations established in 1999
Charities based in Essex
1999 establishments in the United Kingdom